Yvonne Agneta Ryding (born 14 December 1962, in Eskilstuna, Södermanland) is a Swedish dancer, model, TV Host and beauty queen who was crowned Miss Universe 1984 on 9 July 1984. She is the third Swede in history to win the title, and the most recent one.

Early life
She was born to Agneta and Sten Ryding, Prior to being crowned Miss Sweden and competing in the Miss Universe pageant, Ryding was a Swedish National Lucia Bride, formerly midfield soccer player and nurse.

After Miss Universe
Following the year as Miss Universe, Ryding worked within the fashion industry and also did some commission work. In 1988 her homesickness got the upper hand and she moved back to Sweden. In 1989 she presented the Swedish competition Melodifestivalen.
In 1997, she launched her skincare line originally called Y.
Ryding. She was a guest of honor of the Miss Universe 2006 competition, held in Los Angeles, United States.

She is divorced from Swedish actor Kjell Bergqvist, whom she met in Monaco in 1986. The couple has two daughters. In 2007, Ryding competed against eleven other Swedish celebrities in the television dance contest Let's Dance, and was eliminated on 23 February.

She participated in Farmen VIP 2018 which is broadcast on TV4.

See also
Miss Sweden

References

External links

Yvonne Ryding official homepage
Miss Universe 1984 Gallery
https://web.archive.org/web/20081011012845/http://www.pageantopolis.com/international/Universe_1984.htm
http://www.tipsoninterview.in/miss-universe-1984-winner
Grattis till 30-årsjubileet Yvonne Ryding 

1962 births
Let's Dance (Swedish TV series)
Living people
Miss Universe 1984 contestants
Miss Universe winners
Miss Sweden winners
People from Eskilstuna
Swedish beauty pageant winners
Swedish female models
Swedish nurses
Swedish television hosts
Swedish women television presenters
20th-century Swedish women